Kabiri may refer to:

Kabiri, Cabeiri, enigmatic chthonic deities of Greek mythology

People
Amir Gross Kabiri, Israeli businessman, art collector, owner of Hapoel Tel Aviv F.C
Muhiddin Kabiri (born 1965), also known as Kabirov, Tajik Muslim politician, former member of the parliament of Tajikistan
Rabi-ollah Kabiri (1889-1947), Iranian Azerbaijani general and politician and minister in Ja'far Pishevari's Cabinet in northern Iran
Uri Kabiri (born 1970), Israeli songwriter, actor and musical producer

Places
Kabiri, Angola, a town and commune in the municipality of Ícolo e Bengo, Luanda Province, Angola
Kabiri, Iran (disambiguation)

See also
Kabir as well as Kabeer